The Tower of Giottani is a ruined Genoese tower on the coast of the commune of Barrettali, northern Corsica.

See also
List of Genoese towers in Corsica

Notes and references

Towers in Corsica